Leonard Trolley (January 1, 1918 – February 10, 2005) was an English actor, who is best known for playing Arthur Forrest in A Family Secret  of the sixth episode of the third series of the British television series, Upstairs, Downstairs.

He is also known for The Message, Rise and Fall of Idi Amin, A Countess from Hong Kong, Bergerac, The Mayor of Casterbridge, The Stud, Consuming Passions, In the Shadow of Kilimanjaro, Champions, Doctor Who (in the serial The Faceless Ones), Prelude to Fame and Z-Cars.

Partial filmography
Prelude to Fame (1950) - Waiter
A Countess from Hong Kong (1967) - Purser
One of Our Dinosaurs Is Missing (1975) - Inspector Eppers
The Message (1976) - Silk Merchant
The Stud (1978) - Doctor (uncredited)
Rise and Fall of Idi Amin (1981) - Bob Astles
Champions (1984) - Steward
In the Shadow of Kilimanjaro (1986) - Colonel Maitland
Consuming Passions (1988) - The Mayor

External links
 
 https://web.archive.org/web/20161025173531/http://hulumoviehd.com/leonard-trolley-actor-recent-0
 http://www.tvguide.com/celebrities/leonard-trolley/credits/161844/

English male film actors
English male television actors
1918 births
2005 deaths
20th-century English male actors
Male actors from London